Jurassic Fight Club (titled Dinosaur Secrets in Australia/the UK) is a paleontology-based television series on History channel which premiered in the US in July 2008. Jurassic Fight Club was hosted by George Blasing, a self-taught paleontologist, and also features well-known paleontologists such as Thomas R. Holtz Jr., Lawrence Witmer, Phillip J. Currie, and others. The show ran for one season of 12 episodes and was not renewed.

Summary
Scientists study the battles of prehistoric creatures, such as dinosaurs, before they became extinct. Each episode features a forensic-styled breakdown of a prehistoric battle. Based on fossil evidence and paleontologic analysis, a computer-generated imagery rendering of the battle, based on the evidence and the imagination of George Blasing (the show's host) is the final act of each episode. In most cases, the battles are based on actual fossil finds, although in several episodes, scientists simply put two contemporaneous prehistoric animals, against each other. It is the second most-watched documentary show on paleontology beaten only by Walking with Dinosaurs, has been quite controversial but has become very popular, for various show reasons.

Episodes

Turf Wars

The Jurassic Fight Club game, Turf Wars was a fighting game that could be found on history.com but is no longer available. You could play as one of six dinosaurs, skills are used to defeat the other five. Cheat codes can make players invincible, access special attacks, etc. These dinosaurs are featured in battle order with their own status:

In popular culture 
The dinosaur-themed rock act Majungas credits the inspiration behind their band name and self-titled song "Majunga" to the episode "Cannibal Dinosaur", which features Majungasaurus.

References

2008 American television series debuts
2008 American television series endings
Documentary films about prehistoric life
History (American TV channel) original programming
Documentary television series about dinosaurs
English-language television shows